Milichiidae bisignata is a species of freeloader fly in the family Milichiidae, found in North and Central America.

References

External links

 

Milichiidae